Harry Prinzler (January 25, 1883 – December 25, 1952) was an American gymnast. He competed in three events at the 1904 Summer Olympics.

References

1883 births
1952 deaths
American male artistic gymnasts
Olympic gymnasts of the United States
Gymnasts at the 1904 Summer Olympics
Sportspeople from Indianapolis